= Kodi Amman Temple =

Hindu Temple in India

Kodi Amman Temple is a Hindu temple situated at Sungan Thidal, 2 kilometres from the town of Thanjavur on the Thanjavur-Kumbakonam road.
